Resorcerer is a resource editing program by Mathemaesthetics for the Macintosh operating systems. The most recent release was in 2001, when separate versions of Resorcerer 2.4.1 were released for Classic Mac OS and Carbon. Developed more recently than the traditional ResEdit, it supports far more resource types. Although no longer updated, it is still available for purchase.

External links
Official website
MacTech Fan Review

Macintosh operating systems development